Fener Island (literally "Lighthouse Island"), also known as Ayasandıras from its Greek name Agios Andreas (Άγιος Ανδρέας), is a Marmara island of Turkey. Administratively it is a part of Bandırma ilçe (district) of Balıkesir Province. It is a long and narrow island in north west to south east direction. There are some islets to the east of the island.

References 

Islands of the Sea of Marmara
Islands of Turkey
Islands of Balıkesir Province
Bandırma